My Heart is a Chainsaw is a 2021 horror novel by Stephen Graham Jones and the first book in The Indian Lake Trilogy. The book is the winner of the 2021 Bram Stoker Award for Novel.

Synopsis
Per the official synopsis:

Release
My Heart is a Chainsaw was first published in the United States on August 31, 2021, in hardback and ebook formats through Gallery/Saga Press. An audiobook adaptation narrated by Cara Gee was released simultaneously through Simon & Schuster Audio. A paperback edition of the book was released on March 29, 2022.

Reception
Critical reception for the book was positive. The novel received praise from NPR and the Washington Post, the former of which called it a "beautiful love letter to horror movies." Rolling Stone praised My Heart is a Chainsaw for being "both an homage to this trope and a big old “fuck you” to the concept that only good girls can prevail".

Awards
 Bram Stoker Award for Novel (2021, won)

References

2020s horror novels
Novels by Stephen Graham Jones
2021 American novels
Bram Stoker Award for Novel winners